This is a complete list of the presidents of the Chamber of Deputies (Czech Republic).

See also
President of the Chamber of Deputies of the Parliament of the Czech Republic

List
Chairs of the Chamber of Deputies
Czech Republic